The Butte Daredevils were a basketball team in the Continental Basketball Association that played from 2006 to 2008.  They played their home games at the Butte Civic Center in Butte, Montana.  The team was named in honor of Butte native Evel Knievel, the famous daredevil. The franchise hosted the 2007 CBA All-Star Game.

The team folded in August 2008 via a letter to the Montana Standard newspaper after months of speculation.

See also
Montana Golden Nuggets
Billings Volcanos (basketball)

Basketball teams established in 2006
Basketball teams disestablished in 2008
Continental Basketball Association teams
Butte, Montana
Basketball teams in Montana
2006 establishments in Montana
2008 disestablishments in Montana